Nikolai Nikolaevich Himmer; commonly known as Nikolai Sukhanov (29 June 1940) was a Russian Menshevik Internationalist and chronicler of the Russian Revolution.

Life
Sukhanov was born in Moscow.  His father, of German descent, was a railway employee, his mother a midwife. His parents split after his birth, and his mother was exiled for seven years in a sensational court case to Siberia for bigamy; in 1898 commuted into one year prison. Himmer gave private lessons while he was at high school. Like his grandmother he was captivated by Tolstoy and Tolstoyanism. In 1900/1902 he traveled through Russia, and met with several revolutionaries (e.g. Lenin, Trotsky, Martov, and Chernov) in Paris. In 1903 he began to study Philology and Philosophy in Moscow, and joined the Socialist Revolutionary Party. Sukhanov was busy with propaganda on agrarian reform and lecturing. Following his arrest in May 1904 for being in possession of illegal literature, he was given an 18-month sentence in the Taganka Prison.

After he was liberated by the crowd in October 1905, he took part in the uprising in Moscow in December. Sukhanov became a contributor to Russkoe Bogatstvo (Russian Wealth) and published (legally) two books on agricultural reform. He was involved in the Socialist Revolutionary Party and argued with the leaders how to explain the Narodniks and Marxism in the right way. He was rearrested in 1911 and sentenced to exile in Archangelsk. (In the meantime his wife left him and moved to Poland with her two sons. Sukhanov remarried Galina Flaksermann) Following his release early March, and having benefited of the amnesty during the festivities of Romanov Tercentenary, he returned to St. Petersburg, where he became an editor of the radical journal  Sovremennik (Contemporary) and Letopis (Chronicle). published by Maxim Gorky. He worked under his own name for the Ministry of Agriculture. As an internationalist he opposed Russia going into war with Germany and Austria.

During the February Revolution in 1917 Sukhanov was one of the founding members of the Executive Committee of the Petrograd Soviet. An advocate of peace negotiations, Sukhanov opposed the aggressive war policies of Alexander Kerensky and Alexander Guchkov, members of the Russian Provisional Government. Sukhanov had been friendly with Anatoly Lunacharsky but did not follow the latter when he joined the Bolsheviks. He became an editor of Novaya Zhizn.

Between 1919 and 1921, Sukhanov wrote a seven-volume memoir of the Russian Revolution of 1917. It was first published in Berlin, but the books (written in Russian) were suppressed under Joseph Stalin in the 1930s. While working at the Agrarian Institute of the Communist Academy, he opposed Stalin's extreme measures concerning the collectivization and industrialization. He was arrested in July 1930. He was sentenced at the 1931 Menshevik Trial, an early show trial by Stalin. Sukhanov was exiled to Tobolsk in Siberia with a 10-year prison sentence. He worked there as a German teacher. In 1937, he was accused of being a spy working for Nazi Germany and engaging in anti-Soviet agitation. He was sentenced to death by the tribunal of the Siberian Military District, and he was executed on 29 June 1940.

Legacy
In 1967, a German translation appeared of the first volume. In 1984 a one-volume abridged version was published in English, edited by Joel Carmichael.

His works were under lock and key until 1991 when, for the first time, a reprint was published in Russia. In 1992, a special rehabilitation committee declared that all accusations against him had been baseless.

References

Sources
 Sukhanov, N. (1919) Zapiski o Revoliutsii (Notes on the Revolution) 
 Nikolaj Nikolajewitsch Suchanow (1967) 1917: Tagebuch der russischen Revolution (Diary of the Russian Revolution). Translated and published by Nikolaus Ehlert, Munich, Piper, 735 S., ill.
 Sukhanov, N. (1984) The Russian Revolution, 1917: A Personal Record.
 Getzler, I. (2002) Nikolai Sukhanov. Chronicler Of The Russian Revolution. 

1882 births
1940 deaths
Writers from Moscow
People from Moskovsky Uyezd
Mensheviks
All-Russian Central Executive Committee members
People of the Russian Revolution
20th-century Russian historians
Soviet politicians
Russian editors
Russian memoirists
20th-century memoirists
1931 Menshevik Trial
Executed Soviet people from Russia
Executed people from Moscow
Russian people executed by the Soviet Union